Streptomyces harenosi is a bacterium species from the genus of Streptomyces which has been isolated from soil from Parangkusumo, Indonesia.

See also 
 List of Streptomyces species

References 

harenosi
Bacteria described in 2020